{{DISPLAYTITLE:D-DOPA}}

-DOPA (-3,4-dihydroxyphenylalanine; dextrodopa) is similar to -DOPA (levodopa), but with opposite chirality. Levo- and dextro- rotation refer to a molecule's ability to rotate planes of polarized light in one or the other direction. Whereas -DOPA is moderately effective in the treatment of Parkinson's disease (PD) and dopamine-responsive dystonia (DRD) by stimulating the production of dopamine in the brain, -DOPA is biologically inactive.

See also
 -DOPA (Levodopa; Sinemet, Parcopa, Atamet, Stalevo, Madopar, Prolopa, etc.)
 -DOPS (Droxidopa)
 Methyldopa (Aldomet, Apo-Methyldopa, Dopamet, Novomedopa, etc.)
 Dopamine (Intropan, Inovan, Revivan, Rivimine, Dopastat, Dynatra, etc.)
 Norepinephrine (Noradrenaline; Levophed, etc.)
 Epinephrine (Adrenaline; Adrenalin, EpiPen, Twinject, etc.)

References

Aromatic amino acids
Catecholamines